Dick Lee Ming-kwai  is a retired Hong Kong law enforcement administrator who formerly served as the Commissioner of Police of Hong Kong from 2003 to 2007.

Biography
Lee attended The Chinese University of Hong Kong and joined the Royal Hong Kong Police Force (now Hong Kong Police Force) in December 1972 as a probationary inspector.

He served as an inspector in both uniform branches and CID in various police divisions in Hong Kong. As a superintendent, he was placed in charge briefly of training and reforming the Hawker Control Unit of the Urban Services Department (now the Food and Environmental Hygiene Department). Later, he was posted to a police school in the United Kingdom.

He was promoted to Chief Superintendent in 1992 and was the district commander of Wan Chai.

In 1995, Lee was promoted to the rank of Assistant Commissioner of Police. During this period, he was in charge of restoring order after rioting broke out at Vietnamese boat people detention centres across Hong Kong against the policy of mandatory repatriation.

Lee was in charge of the security of the Handover Ceremony in 1997. He became well known for ordering the playing of Beethoven's 5th Symphony over a PA system to cover the noise of protesters at the Hong Kong Convention and Exhibition Centre (HKCEC). He received a commendation from the Chief Executive of the HKSAR for his efforts during the handover period.

Lee was promoted to Senior Assistant Commissioner in 1998 and Deputy Commissioner in 2001. He was appointed Commissioner of Police in 2003. He is the first Chinese Commissioner of Police with a university degree.

Lee was well received by both the rank and file and senior officers of the police force. He had a reputation for being an operational commissioner, frequently visiting frontline units and participating in raids on vice premises. Lee would personally visit all colleagues injured on duty. He personally visited the scene of the fatal shooting of a police officer by another in Tsim Sha Tsui in the small hours of 17 March 2006.

Lee's handling of militant Korean protesters during the 6th Ministerial Conference of the World Trade Organisation in December 2006 earned him local and international acclaim. Over 1000 protesters were arrested after attacking police officers and police cordons at the HKCEC with minimal casualties.

Lee is related to former police commissioner Eddie Hui through marriage.

Retirement
Lee formally retired as Commissioner of Police on 15 January 2007. He began a year of paid leave until January 2008. He has stated on an RTHK interview that he will no longer work for a salary after his retirement and intends to spend more time with his family and promoting local sports in Hong Kong.

Awards
1975 – Commanding Officer's Commendation
1977 – Commanding Officer's Commendation
1990 – Colonial Police Long Service Medal
1994 – Colonial Police Medal for Meritorious Service
1997 – Queen's Police Medal for Distinguished Service
1997 – Hong Kong Police Long Service Medal with First Clasp
1998 – Chief Executive's Commendation
2002 – Hong Kong Police Long Service Medal with Second Clasp
2004 – Honorary Fellowship, Chinese University of Hong Kong
2005 – Hong Kong Police Long Service Medal with Third Clasp
2007 – Gold Bauhinia Star

References

Hong Kong Police commissioners
Government officials of Hong Kong
1950 births
Living people
Hong Kong civil servants
Alumni of the Chinese University of Hong Kong
Recipients of the Colonial Police Medal
Hong Kong recipients of the Queen's Police Medal